The 1996 United States Senate election in Illinois took place on November 5, 1996. Incumbent Democratic U.S. Senator Paul Simon chose to retire rather than seek a third term in office. In the Democratic primary, U.S. Representative Dick Durbin emerged victorious, while state representative Al Salvi won the Republican primary. Though the election was initially anticipated to be close, Durbin ended up defeating Salvi by a comfortable double-digit margin of victory, allowing him to win what would be the first of several terms in the Senate.

Election information
The primaries and general elections coincided with those for other federal offices (president and House), as well as those for state offices.

Turnout
For the primaries, turnout was 25.85%, with 1,583,406 votes cast. For the general election, turnout was 63.79%, with 4,250,722 votes cast.

Democratic primary

Candidates
 Jalil Ahmad, real estate agent
 Dick Durbin, U.S. Representative
 Ronald F. Gibbs, advisor to former Chicago Mayor Harold Washington
 Paul H. D. Park
 Pat Quinn, Illinois State Treasurer

Results

Republican primary

Candidates
 Al Salvi, State Representative
 Martin Paul Gallagher
 Wayne S. Kurzeja
 Bob Kustra, Lieutenant Governor of Illinois
 Robert Marshall, perennial candidate

Results

Libertarian primary

Candidates
 David F. Hoscheidt
 Robin J. Miller

Results

General election

Results
Durbin won the election easily.

See also 
 1996 United States Senate elections

References 

Illinois
1996
United States Senate